Pseudocrossocheilus is a genus of cyprinid fish endemic to China.  There are currently six recognized species in this genus.

Species
 Pseudocrossocheilus bamaensis (S. M. Fang, 1981)
 Pseudocrossocheilus liuchengensis (L. Liang, C. X. Liu & Q. L. Wu, 1987)
 Pseudocrossocheilus longibullus (R. F. Su, J. X. Yang & G. H. Cui, 2003)
 Pseudocrossocheilus nigrovittatus (R. F. Su, J. X. Yang & G. H. Cui, 2003)
 Pseudocrossocheilus papillolabrus (R. F. Su, J. X. Yang & G. H. Cui, 2003)
 Pseudocrossocheilus tridentis (G. H. Cui & X. L. Chu, 1986)

References
 

 
Cyprinid fish of Asia
Freshwater fish of China
Cyprinidae genera